The 2018 London Spitfire season was the first season of the London Spitfire's existence in the Overwatch League. The team finished with a regular season record of 24–16, which was the fifth best in the Overwatch League.

London qualified for the Stage 1 and Stage 2 Playoffs. In the stage 1 playoffs, London defeated the Houston Outlaws in the semifinals and New York Excelsior in the finals. The team lost in the Stage 2 semifinals to the Philadelphia Fusion. The team also qualified for the Season Playoffs, in which they won in the Grand Finals against the Philadelphia Fusion.

Preceding offseason 
Cloud9 was awarded the London slot for an OWL franchise on 10 August 2017 and was later named the London Spitfire. Shortly afterwards, they disclosed their 12-player inaugural season roster, the maximum permitted, which would be entirely composed of the following South Korean players:
Kim "birdring" Ji-hyeok
Park "Profit" Joon-yeong
Kim "Rascal" Dong-jun
Lee "Hooreg" Dong-eun
Hong "Gesture" Jae-hui
Baek "Fissure" Chan-hyung
Choi "Bdosin" Seung-tae
Kim "NUS" Jong-seok
Jung "Closer" Won-sik
Jo "HaGoPeun" Hyeon-woo
Kim "Fury" Jun-ho
Seong "WooHyaL" Seung-hyun
The roster would mainly be an amalgamation of their current Cloud9 KONGDOO core and OGN's Overwatch APEX Season 4 champions GC Busan.

Review

Regular season 
On 11 January, the Spitfire played their first regular season Overwatch League match in a 3–1 victory over the Florida Mayhem. They would end Stage 1 of the 2018 Season with a  record, earning them the third and final spot in the Stage 1 Playoffs. The team then became the first-ever stage playoffs champions, after achieving victories over the Houston Outlaws (3–1) and the New York Excelsior (3–2) in a reverse sweep.

On 7 March 2018, midway through Stage 2, the Spitfire parted ways with head coach Lee "Bishop" Beom-joon for undisclosed reasons. The team finished Stage 2 with an improved  record and attained another stage playoffs berth. However, they fell short to the Philadelphia Fusion in a thrilling 2–3 semi-finals series.

However, after stage 2, the Spitfire failed to make another stage playoffs, going 5–5 in stage 3 and 4–6 in stage 4. They had to bank on their earlier results to edge them over the finish line. They would end the season with a  record, good for 5th place and a spot in the postseason where they would face the Los Angeles Gladiators.

Playoffs 
London lost their first postseason matchup against the Gladiators on 11 July by a score of 0–3 in the quarterfinals. The Spitfire turned it around the next two games against the Gladiators, winning in 3–0 sweeps in matches two and three and advancing the team to the semifinals. London won both games against the Los Angeles Valiant in the semifinals, winning 3–0 in match one and 3–1 in match two. London claimed the 2018 Overwatch League championship after defeating the Philadelphia Fusion on 27 and 28 July by scores of 3–1 and 3–0, respectively.

Final roster

Transactions 
Transactions of/for players on the roster during the 2018 regular season:
On 20 February, Spitfire transferred Baek "Fissure" Chan-hyung to Los Angeles Gladiators.
On 21 February, Spitfire released Kim "Rascal" Dong-jun.
On 8 March, Spitfire signed Hwang "TiZi" Jang-hyeon.
On 18 June, Spitfire released Jo "HaGoPeun" Hyeon-woo, Hwang "TiZi" Jang-hyeon, Seong "WooHyaL" Seung-hyun, and Lee "Hooreg" Dong-eun.

Standings

Record by stage

League

Game log

Preseason

Regular season

Playoffs

References 

2018 Overwatch League seasons by team
London Spitfire
London Spitfire seasons